Visa requirements for Japanese citizens are administrative entry restrictions by the authorities of other states placed on citizens of Japan.

 Japanese citizens had visa-free or visa on arrival access to 193 countries and territories, making the Japanese passport the most powerful passport in the world in terms of travel freedom according to the Henley Passport Index.

Besides the Japanese passport, there are only 3 other passports that provide either visa-free entry, or entry via an electronic travel authorisation—those of Brunei, San Marino and Singapore—to the world's four largest economies:

 China (visa-free, 15 days)
 India (Visa on arrival, e-Visa, 60 days)
 Schengen Area (visa-free, 90 days within 180 days)
 United States (ESTA required for arrivals by air and sea, 90 days).

2020 travel restrictions

Due to the COVID-19 pandemic, several countries have imposed temporary travel restrictions on Japanese citizens or persons arriving from Japan.

As of 30 July 2021, Japanese Ministry of Foreign Affairs reports that the 172 countries and regions are imposing some sorts of travel restrictions for the travelers from Japan and other countries. Within these 172 countries and regions, 67 countries and regions are still prohibiting the entry by Japanese and other international visitors.

Visa requirements map

Visa requirements
Visa requirements for holders of normal passports travelling for tourist purposes:

Territories, disputed areas or restricted zones
Visa requirements for Japanese citizens for visits to various territories, disputed areas, partially recognized countries and restricted zones:

Pre-approved visas pick-up
Pre-approved visas can be picked up on arrival in the following countries instead in embassy or consulate.

APEC Business Travel Card

Holders of an APEC Business Travel Card (ABTC)  travelling on business do not require a visa to the following countries:

1 – up to 90 days
2 – up to 60 days
3 – up to 59 days

The card must be used in conjunction with a passport and has the following advantages:
undertake legitimate business in participating economies
expedited border crossing in all member economies, including transitional members
expedited scheduling of visa interview (United States)

Consular protection of Japanese citizens abroad

Non-visa restrictions

See also

Visa policy of Japan
Japanese passport
Visa requirements for United States citizens

References and Notes
References

Notes

Foreign relations of Japan
Japan